On the Border is a 1974 album by the Eagles.

On the Border may also refer to:

Film and television
 On the Border (film), a 1930 American drama 
 On the Border (1998 film), an American TV film starring Casper Van Dien
 On the Border (Armenian TV series), a 2015 action drama
 On the Border (South Korean TV series), or Those Who Cross the Line, a 2018–2021 South Korean TV series

Other uses
 On the Border Mexican Grill & Cantina, an American and South Korean restaurant chain
 On the Border, a 2005 book by Michel Warschawski
 Rajalla ('On the Border'), a 1930s Finnish poem collection by L. Onerva
 "On the Border", a song by Al Stewart on the 1976 album Year of the Cat
 Frederiksberg Kommunale Funktionærers Boligforening, or "Ved Grænsen" ('On the Border'), a Danish area of houses

See also
 Borderline (disambiguation)
 Border (disambiguation)
 Borderline personality disorder, a mental illness
 "On the Borderline", a 2003 single by Bec Cartwright